Mitsuneyama Keiji, real name Tōichi Shimamura (7 February 1922 – 15 August 1989) was a sumo wrestler from Arakawa, Tokyo, Japan who won the top division yūshō or tournament championship in 1954. His highest rank was ōzeki and he earned nine kinboshi or gold stars for defeating yokozuna when ranked as a maegashira, and seven special prizes. After his retirement in 1960 he was the head coach of Takashima stable.

Career

He began his professional career in 1937, joining Takashima stable, reaching the top makuuchi division in 1944. He earned nine kinboshi or gold stars for defeating yokozuna whilst ranked as a maegashira, and seven sanshō or special prizes. In 1953, at the age of 31, he was promoted to the second highest rank of ōzeki, after 16 tournaments in the lower san'yaku ranks, ten at sekiwake and six at komusubi. Three tournaments later he took his only top division yūshō or tournament championship, with a 12–3 record. At 32 years and one month he is the sixth oldest first time yūshō winner since World War II, behind Kyokutenhō, Tamawashi, Tamanoumi, Yoshibayama and Takatōriki. He lost the ōzeki rank in 1955, largely due to injuries. He carried on fighting in the maegashira ranks, last under the shikona Mitsuneyama Hōkoku, until January 1960 when he retired at the age of nearly 38.

Retirement from sumo
He remained in the sumo world as a toshiyori or elder of the Japan Sumo Association under the name Kumagatani Oyakata and founded his own Kumagatani stable. In May 1961 he acquired the Takashima elder name and changed the name of the stable to Takashima stable. He produced the top division wrestlers Daiju and Kōbōyama, but resigned due to ill health in 1982, the heya being absorbed into another incarnation of Kumagatani stable founded by the former Yoshinomine. He continued to work as a coach at Kumagatani before leaving the Sumo Association in January 1985. He died in 1989.

Pre-modern top division record

Through most of the 1940s only two tournaments were held a year and only one tournament was held in 1946. The New Year tournament began and the Spring tournament  returned to Osaka tournament in 1953.

Modern tournament record
Since the addition of the Kyushu tournament in 1957 and the Nagoya tournament in 1958, the yearly schedule has remained unchanged.

See also
List of sumo record holders
List of sumo tournament top division champions
List of sumo tournament second division champions
List of past sumo wrestlers
List of ōzeki

References

1922 births
1989 deaths
Japanese sumo wrestlers
Ōzeki
People from Arakawa, Tokyo
Sumo people from Tokyo